Epidermolysis bullosa simplex (EBS) is a disorder resulting from mutations in the genes encoding keratin 5 or keratin 14.

Epidermolysis bullosa simplex (EBS) is one of the major forms of epidermolysis bullosa, a group of genetic conditions that cause the skin to be very fragile and to blister easily. Blister formation of EBS occurs at the dermal-epidermal junction.

Cause

Epidermolysis bullosa simplex is caused by genetic mutations that prevent the proper formation of protein structures in the skin’s epidermis. This results in skin that blisters easily, from even minor insults.  The affected genes, KRT5 and the KRT14, which are responsible for the creation of keratin 5 and keratin 14 proteins respectively, are tied to the four major types of epidermolysis bullosa simplex. However, a small number of epidermolysis bullosa simplex patients do not have mutations in their KRT5 and KRT14 genes.  Mutations in the PLEC gene are also being researched, specifically in the gene’s role in the Ogna form of epidermolysis bullosa simplex.  The PLEC gene is responsible for the formation of plectin, another skin protein that attaches the epidermis to the skin’s deeper layers.

Diagnosis

Classification
Epidermolysis bullosa simplex may be divided into multiple types:

Management
 No cure for EB
 Treat symptoms
 Protect skin, stop blister formation, promote healing
 Prevent complications
 Necessary treatment: use oral and topical steroid for healing and prevent complication
 Maintain cool environment, avoid overheating and decreases friction

See also
 Epidermolysis bullosa
 List of cutaneous conditions caused by mutations in keratins

References

Further reading

  GeneReviews/NCBI/UW/NIH entry on Epidermolysis Bullosa Simplex

External links 

Genodermatoses
Rare diseases
Cytoskeletal defects